A Liar's Autobiography: The Untrue Story of Monty Python's Graham Chapman is a 2012 British animated semi-biographical comedy film that is a portrayal of the life of Monty Python alumnus Graham Chapman. The film is loosely based on A Liar's Autobiography: Volume VI, a book written by Chapman and David Sherlock. It received a limited theatrical release on 2 November 2012 in the United States, and aired on the Epix TV channel on the same day.

Voice cast
 Graham Chapman as himself
 Terry Gilliam as Graham's psychiatrist
 John Cleese as David Frost
 Michael Palin as Graham's father
 Terry Jones as Graham's mother
 Cameron Diaz as Sigmund Freud
 Philip Bulcock as David Sherlock
 Justin McDonald as young David Sherlock
 André Jacquemin as himself
 Margarita Doyle as Sylvia Kristel

Various characters voiced by Palin, Jones, Cleese, Carol Cleveland, and Stephen Fry.

Production
In June 2011, it was announced that Bill and Ben Productions were making A Liar's Autobiography, an animated 3D film based on the memoir. The full name is A Liar's Autobiography: The Untrue Story of Monty Python's Graham Chapman. Although not a Monty Python film, all but one of the remaining Pythons are involved in the project. Asked what was true in a deliberately fanciful account by Chapman of his life, Terry Jones joked: "Nothing... it's all a downright, absolute, blackguardly lie."

The film uses Chapman's own voice—from a reading of his autobiography shortly before he died of cancer—and entertainment channel EPIX has announced that the film is in both 2D and 3D formats. Produced and directed by London-based Bill Jones, Jeff Simpson, and Ben Timlett, the film used 14 animation companies, each working on chapters that range from 3 to 12 minutes in length, with each chapter in a different style similar to Opéra imaginaire.

John Cleese recorded dialogue which was matched with Chapman's voice. Michael Palin voiced Chapman's father and Terry Jones voiced his mother. Terry Gilliam voiced his psychiatrist. They all play various other roles. Among the original Python group, only Eric Idle was not involved, although he can be seen during footage of John Cleese's eulogy at Chapman's memorial service near the end of the film.

Release
A Liar's Autobiography was first screened at the 2012 Toronto International Film Festival in September 2012 and premiered in the UK on 16 October 2012 as part of the BFI London Film Festival. The film's official trailer claims that Chapman said, "This is the best film I've been in since I died."

Reception
The film received mixed reviews from critics. On Metacritic, the film has a 45/100 rating, signifying "mixed or average reviews".

References

External links
 
 
 
 

Monty Python
2012 films
2012 3D films
3D animated films
2012 animated films
2012 comedy films
British 3D films
British animated films
British LGBT-related films
British comedy films
2012 LGBT-related films
British independent films
Animated comedy films
LGBT-related animated films
Animated films based on literature
Male bisexuality in film
Biographical films about LGBT people
2010s English-language films
2010s British films
Films based on autobiographies